Vrej Nersessian (born 1948) is the Curator of the Christian Middle East Section (Asia, Pacific and African Collections) at the British Library, London.

Life

He is a senior priest of the Armenian Apostolic Church, holds a doctorate in theology from the King's College London, writes on the Christian Middle East, and is the author of a number of works on Armenian Christian art and Christianity, including Treasures from the Ark: 1700 Years of Armenian Christian Art (The British Library, 2001), The Bible in the Armenian Tradition (The J. Paul Getty Museum, 2001), the Armenian Illuminated Gospel Books (The British Library, 1987), and The Tondrakian Movement (Kahn & Averill, 1987). He is married and has two sons.

References

External links
Vrej Nersessian's biography

British people of Armenian descent
Armenian studies scholars
Living people
1948 births
Alumni of King's College London
Armenian Apostolic Christians